Larry Winget (born 1952) is a professional motivational speaker, bestselling author, television personality and social commentator. Winget markets himself as "the trademarked 'Pitbull of Personal Development' and 'World's Only Irritational Speaker'".

Early life and education
Winget was raised in Muskogee, Oklahoma.  Both his parents were in retail. He graduated from Central High School in Muskogee, Oklahoma and from Northeastern Oklahoma State University in Tahlequah, Oklahoma.  In 2018, Winget was named Distinguished Alumni by Northeastern Oklahoma State University.

Personal life
Winget is married to Rose Mary Winget and has two sons, Tyler and Patrick.  He lives in Phoenix, Arizona.

Career
Winget is the author of six New York Times/Wall Street Journal bestsellers. He hosted the television series Big Spender on A&E. He has appeared on several television shows including Tool Academy, Crowd Rules and Dr. Phil.  He has appeared in two PBS specials, two CNBC specials of The Millionaire Inside and is a regular on many national news shows on CNBC, MSNBC, FOX Business Network and FOX News.

Works

Books
 Shut Up, Stop Whining, & Get A Life: A Kick-Butt Approach to a Better Life (2004) 
 It's Called Work For A Reason (2007) 
 You're Broke Because You Want To Be: How to Stop Getting By and Start Getting Ahead (2008) 
 People Are Idiots and I Can Prove It!: The Ten Ways You Are Sabotaging Your Life and How To Overcome Them (2008) 
 No Time For Tact: 365 Days of The Wit, Words and Wisdom of Larry Winget (2009) 
 Your Kids Are Your Own Fault: A Guide For Raising Responsible, Productive Adults (2009) 
 The Idiot Factor: The 10 Ways We Sabotage Our Life, Money and Business (2009) 
 Shut Up, Stop Whining & Get A Life comic book version (2010)
 Grow A Pair; How To Stop Being A Victim and Take Back Your Life, Your Business and Your Sanity (2013) 
 What's Wrong With Damn Near Everything: How The Collapse of Core Values Is Destroying Us and How To Fix It (2017)

Books For Speakers 
60 Ways to Get Rich and Stay Rich in the Speaking Business (out of print)

Media

 Larry Winget VT Virtual Training University, an interactive, online training system for life and business. 
 Larry Live - CD/DVD based on Shut Up Stop Whining and Get A Life.
 The Notorious Larry Winget based on  It's Called Work For A Reason.
 I'll Try To Be Nicer If You'll Try To Be Smarter - CD/DVD (no longer available).
 "Success Is Your Own Fault" Released as a national PBS Special
 "The Truth Be Told" a live DVD recorded in 2008 – 90 minutes
 "Larry: Unplugged, Unleashed and Out Of Control" - 2009
 Success Is Your Own Damn Fault released by Nightingale-Conant corporation and contains 6 CDs - 1 DVD and a workbook.
  "Get Out Of Your Own Way" released by Nightingale-Conant corporation and contains 4 CDs and 1 DVD.
 "A Year Of Success" with fellow experts, Mark Sanborn, Bob Burg and Sally Hogshead, a 52-week video series for personal development.
 "A Year Of Business Success" with fellow experts Randy Pennington, Scott McKain, Lisa Ford, and Mark Sanborn,  a 52-week video series for businesses.
 "What's Wrong with Damn Near Everything! Larry Winget visits with Kurt Schemers" - 2017

References

External links

 Official Website
 Transcript of his interview on CNN
 Winget's home featured on television

1952 births
Living people
American business writers
American motivational speakers
American motivational writers
American self-help writers
Writers from Muskogee, Oklahoma